The 2015 Cork Junior A Football Championship was the 117th staging of the Cork Junior A Football Championship since its establishment by the Cork County Board. The draw for the opening fixtures took place on 14 December 2014. The championship ran from 12 September to 25 October 2015.

The final was played on 25 October 2015 at Páirc Uí Rinn in Cork, between Bandon and Iveleary, in what was their first meeting in the final in 86 years. Bandon won the match by 3-11 to 2-09 to claim their fifth championship title overall and a first title in 40 years.

Bandon's Mark Sugrue was the championship's top scorer with 4-18.

Qualification

Results

Quarter-finals

Semi-finals

Final

Championship Statistics

Top scorers

Overall

In a single game

References

2015 in Irish sport
Cork Junior Football Championship